1st Fighter Division (1. Jagd-Division) was one of the primary divisions of the German Luftwaffe in World War II.  It was formed on 1 May 1942 in Deelen from Stab/1. Nachtjagd-Division and redesignated 3. Jagd-Division on 15 September 1943. It was immediately reformed on 15 September 1943 in Döberitz from the 4. Jagd-Division.
The Division was subordinated to XII. Fliegerkorps (May 1942 – September 1943), I. Jagdkorps (September 1943 – January 1945) and IX (J) Fliegerkorps (January 1945 – May 1945).

Commanding officers
Generalleutnant Kurt-Bertram von Döring, 1 May 1942 – 15 September 1943
Oberst Günther Lützow, 15 September 1943 – 23 March 1944
Oberst Hajo Herrmann, 23 March 1944 – 1 September 1944 
Generalleutnant Kurt Kleinrath, 1 September 1944 – 8 December 1944
Oberst Heinrich Wittmer, December 1944 – 5 April 1945
Generalmajor Walter Grabmann, 5 April 1945 – 29 April 1945
Oberst Karl-Gottfried Nordmann, April 1945 – May 1945

Subordinated units

See also
Luftwaffe Organisation

References

Air divisions of the Wehrmacht Luftwaffe
Articles which contain graphical timelines